Suwon Korea Electric Power Corporation Vixtorm is a South Korean volleyball team. The team was founded in 1945 and became fully professional in 2008. They are based in Suwon and are members of the Korea Volleyball Federation (KOVO). Their home arena is Suwon Gymnasium in Suwon.

Honours 
KOVO Cup
Winners (3): 2016, 2017, 2020
Runners-up (1): 2022

Season-by-season records

Players

2021−22 team

See also
 Korea Electric Power Corporation

References

External links 
  

Volleyball clubs established in 1945
1945 establishments in Korea
Sport in Suwon
South Korean volleyball clubs